Clathroneuria is a genus of antlions in the family Myrmeleontidae. There are about five described species in Clathroneuria.

Species
 Clathroneuria arapahoe Banks, 1938
 Clathroneuria coquilletti (Currie, 1898)
 Clathroneuria navajo Banks, 1938
 Clathroneuria schwarzi (Currie, 1903)
 Clathroneuria westcotti (Stange, 1970)

References

Further reading

 

Myrmeleontidae